The 1st Annual Grammy Awards were held on May 4, 1959. They recognized musical accomplishments by performers for the year 1958. Two separate ceremonies were held simultaneously on the same day; the first hotel in Beverly Hills, California, and the second in the Park Sheraton Hotel in New York City. Ella Fitzgerald, Count Basie, Domenico Modugno, Ross Bagdasarian, and Henry Mancini, each won 2 awards.

Award winners 
The following awards were given in the first award ceremony:

General
Record of the Year
 "Nel Blu Dipinto di Blu (Volare)" – Domenico Modugno
 "Catch a Falling Star" – Perry Como
 "Fever" – Peggy Lee
 "The Chipmunk Song" – David Seville and the Chipmunks
 "Witchcraft" – Frank Sinatra

Album of the Year
The Music from Peter Gunn – Henry Mancini
Tchaikovsky: Concerto No. 1 In B-Flat Minor, Op. 23 – Van Cliburn
Ella Fitzgerald Sings the Irving Berlin Song Book – Ella Fitzgerald
Come Fly with Me – Frank Sinatra
Only the Lonely – Frank Sinatra

Song of the Year
 "Nel Blu Dipinto di Blu (Volare)" – Franco Migliacci and Domenico Modugno, songwriters (Domenico Modugno)
 "Catch a Falling Star" – Lee Pockriss and Paul Vance, songwriters (Perry Como)
 "Gigi" – Alan Jay Lerner and Frederick Loewe, songwriters (Vic Damone)
 "Fever" – Eddie Cooley and Johnny Davenport, songwriters (Peggy Lee)
 "Witchcraft" – Cy Coleman and Carolyn Leigh, songwriters (Frank Sinatra)

Children's
Best Recording for Children
Ross Bagdasarian Sr. for "The Chipmunk Song (Christmas Don't Be Late)" performed by Ross Bagdasarian Sr. as "David Seville and the Chipmunks"

Comedy
Best Comedy Performance
Ross Bagdasarian, Sr. for "The Chipmunk Song", performed by Ross Bagdasarian Sr. as "David Seville and the Chipmunks"

Composing and arranging
Best Musical Composition First Recorded and Released in 1958 (over 5 minutes duration)
Nelson Riddle (composer) for "Cross Country Suite"
Best Arrangement
Henry Mancini (arranger & artist) for The Music from Peter Gunn

Country
Best Country & Western Performance
The Kingston Trio for "Tom Dooley"

Jazz
Best Jazz Performance, Individual
Ella Fitzgerald for Ella Fitzgerald Sings the Duke Ellington Songbook
Best Jazz Performance, Group
Count Basie for Basie

Musical show
Best Original Cast Album (Broadway or TV)
Meredith Willson (composer) & the original cast with Robert Preston, Barbara Cook, David Burns, Eddie Hodges, Pert Kelton & Helen Raymond for The Music Man
Best Sound Track Album, Dramatic Picture Score or Original Cast
André Previn & the original cast for Gigi (Original Motion Picture Soundtrack)

Packaging and notes
Best Album Cover Photography
Frank Sinatra for Frank Sinatra Sings for Only the Lonely

Pop
Best Vocal Performance, Female
Ella Fitzgerald for Ella Fitzgerald Sings the Irving Berlin Songbook
Best Vocal Performance, Male
Perry Como for "Catch a Falling Star"
Best Performance by a Vocal Group or Chorus
Keely Smith & Louis Prima for "That Old Black Magic"
Best Performance by a Dance Band
Count Basie for Basie
Best Performance by an Orchestra
Billy May for Billy May's Big Fat Brass

Production and engineering
Best Engineered Record - Non-Classical
Ted Keep (engineer) for "The Chipmunk Song" performed by David Seville
Best Engineered Record (Classical)
Sherwood Hall III (engineer), Laurindo Almeida & Salli Terri for Duets with Spanish Guitar

R&B
Best Rhythm & Blues Performance
"Tequila"-The Champs

Spoken
Best Performance, Documentary or Spoken Word
Stan Freberg for The Best of the Stan Freberg Shows

References

 001
1959 in New York City
1959 music awards
1959 in Los Angeles
1959 in American music
May 1959 events in the United States
Events in New York City
Events in Los Angeles